Father Ted is a sitcom created by Irish writers Graham Linehan and Arthur Mathews and produced by British production company Hat Trick Productions for Channel 4.  It aired over three series from 21 April 1995 until 1 May 1998, including a Christmas special, for a total of 25 episodes. It aired on Nine Network (series 1) and ABC Television (series 2 and 3) in Australia, and on TV2 in New Zealand.

Set on the fictional Craggy Island, a remote location off Ireland's west coast, Father Ted stars Dermot Morgan as Father Ted Crilly, alongside fellow priests Father Dougal McGuire (Ardal O'Hanlon) and Father Jack Hackett (Frank Kelly). Dishonourably exiled on the island by Bishop Leonard Brennan (Jim Norton) for various reasons, the priests live together in the parochial house with their housekeeper Mrs Doyle (Pauline McLynn). The show subverts parodies of low-brow humour as it portrays nuanced themes of loneliness, agnosticism, existentialism and purgatory experienced by its title character; this deeper meaning of the show has been much acclaimed.

Father Ted won several British Academy Television Awards—including twice for Best Comedy Series, and remains a popular sitcom in the UK and Ireland. In a 2001 Channel 4 poll, Dougal was ranked fifth on their list of the 100 Greatest TV Characters. In 2019, Father Ted was named the second-greatest British sitcom (after Fawlty Towers) by a panel of comedy experts for Radio Times.

Synopsis

The show follows the misadventures of three Irish Roman Catholic priests who live in a parish on the fictional Craggy Island, located off the west coast of Ireland. Father Ted Crilly, Father Dougal McGuire and Father Jack Hackett live chaotically together in Craggy Island's parochial house, along with their housekeeper Mrs Doyle, who always wants to serve them tea.

The three priests answer to Bishop Len Brennan, who has banished them to Craggy Island as punishment for different incidents in their past: Ted for alleged financial impropriety (apparently involving some money "resting" in his account and a child being deprived of a visit to Lourdes so that Ted could go to Las Vegas), Dougal for an event only referred to as the "Blackrock Incident" (resulting in "many nuns' lives [being] irreparably damaged"), and Jack for his alcoholism and womanising, particularly for an unspecified incident at a wedding in Athlone.

The show revolves around the priests' lives on Craggy Island, sometimes dealing with matters of the church but more often dealing with Father Ted's schemes to either resolve a situation with the parish or other Craggy Island residents, or to win games of one-upmanship against his enemy, Father Dick Byrne of the nearby Rugged Island parish.

Episodes

Production

Writing

Linehan and Mathews first met while working at Hot Press. In the late 1980s, Mathews, Paul Woodfull and Kieran Woodfull formed The Joshua Trio, a U2 tribute band. The trio began writing comedy sketches to accompany their act. Mathews created the Father Ted character for his short-lived stand-up routine. Before The Joshua Trio played at gigs, Mathews would occasionally come on-stage as Father Ted and tell jokes involving his great friend, Father Dougal McGuire.

In 1991, Mathews left his job at Hot Press and moved into Linehan's London home. Over the next three to four years, they worked on rough ideas for shows while at the same time writing for sketch shows such as The All New Alexei Sayle Show and The Fast Show. One of these ideas was for a comedy mockumentary series called Irish Lives, with six episodes, each focusing on a different character living somewhere in Ireland. They scripted an episode centring on a priest named Father Ted Crilly, who visits his friends in the seminary in Maynooth College. Producer Geoffrey Perkins suggested that the episode's concept be dramatised and rewritten as a sitcom.

In the January 1994 issue of In Dublin (Vol 19, No2), Mathews and Linehan told Damian Corless, who had initially introduced the pair to each other, of their work in progress, describing Ted as "basically a nice man", Dougal as "nice but really stupid" and Jack as "a hideous creature". Linehan revealed: "They've all been sent to this isolated place called Craggy Island because they're crap priests." Mathews elaborated: "They've each a terrible secret which is why they've been banished to this place, and the terrible thing is that they can't get away from each other. Obviously it's not entirely reality based." Mathews was originally intended to play Ted, but decided he lacked the acting ability the role required. Maurice O'Donoghue, who plays Father Dick in the series, was their second choice for the role of Ted, being the right age and having a similar look and lightness. Mathews always preferred Dermot Morgan; Linehan was initially reluctant, fearing he would play Ted the same as "Father Trendy", a character he played on the RTÉ television show The Live Mike, but Morgan lobbied hard for the role and was cast.

The show was pitched directly to the UK's Hat Trick Productions and Channel 4 by the duo, contrary to rumours that RTÉ (the Irish national broadcaster) were originally offered the series but rejected it.

Recording
Three series and one Christmas special were aired. Declan Lowney directed the first two series and the Christmas special, while the third series was directed by Linehan (location scenes) and Andy De Emmony (studio scenes). In addition, Morgan and O'Hanlon hosted an hour of Comic Relief in character, during which Kelly and McLynn also made brief guest appearances. One day after the shooting of series three wrapped, Dermot Morgan died of a heart attack, aged 45. As a mark of respect, the third series was first broadcast a week later than originally planned.

The show was already scheduled to conclude with the third series prior to Morgan's death, as Morgan said that he did not want to continue playing the role of Father Ted for fear of being typecast: "I don't want to be the next Clive Dunn and end up playing the same character for years."

Following Morgan's death, the production company received calls from numerous agents and casting directors suggesting either new actors for the role of Ted or spin-offs without the character; Linehan and Mathews declined all offers.

Music
In 1994, the writers asked alternative rock band Pulp to compose the theme music for Father Ted, requesting a parody of a typical sitcom theme. When Pulp declined involvement, they contacted Neil Hannon, frontman of Northern Irish chamber pop band The Divine Comedy. Hannon's first effort, a jaunty composition, was rejected on Geoffrey Perkins's advice. Hannon composed a second theme, which the team found acceptable. This theme was recorded by Hannon and co-producer Darren Allison at The Jesus and Mary Chain's private studio. One of William Reid's guitars was selected by Allison and Hannon to carry the main tune, which was played by Hannon. Both themes were also reworked, with new lyrics, for inclusion on The Divine Comedy's 1996 album Casanova: the final Father Ted theme became "Songs of Love", while Hannon's rejected theme became "A Woman of the World".

In 2010, Linehan discussed the dramatic effect this choice had on the tone of the series: "'Woman of the World' was kind of like a jaunty, plinky-plonky song, and we wanted that song. He [Hannon] gave us two choices: he gave us that, and 'Songs of Love', and we wanted the plinky-plonky song because our idea was we were making fun of sitcoms. We were saying, you know, we don't like sitcoms. This is a parody of sitcoms. This is a kind of satire on sitcoms. And I remember Geoffrey [Perkins] looking really glum and sad about this, you know? And then he said, 'Why do you want to make fun of your characters?' He said, 'People will love these characters.' And that was just a real revelation for me, and after that, whatever he said went, as far as I was concerned."

The Divine Comedy also contributed most of the show's original music, including the songs "Big Men in Frocks" (for the episode "Rock-a-Hula Ted"), "My Lovely Horse" and "The Miracle is Mine" (for "A Song for Europe"), and "My Lovely Mayo Mammy" (for "Night of the Nearly Dead"). Neil Hannon also provided Ted and Dougal's vocals in the dream sequence version of "My Lovely Horse", which was produced by Allison and Hannon, and later appeared as a B-side on the band's single "Gin Soaked Boy".

Location

The interior scenes were recorded at the London Studios in front of a live studio audience, while exterior filming was at various locations in Ireland. Location work for Father Ted was done mostly in County Clare, including locations at Corofin, Ennis, Kilfenora, Ennistymon, and Kilnaboy. The Parochial House is McCormack's at Glenquin, on the Boston road from Kilnaboy. The cinema featured in "The Passion of St Tibulus" was the Ormonde Cinema, Greystones, County Wicklow and "The Field", the location for Funland in "'Good Luck, Father Ted'", is in Portrane, North County Dublin. The 'Very Dark Caves' featured in "The Mainland" were the Aillwee caves in the Burren, County Clare.

Some exterior shots for the episode "And God Created Woman" were filmed in Dún Laoghaire, South County Dublin. The opening sequence (including shots of the Plassy shipwreck) were filmed over Inisheer — the smallest of the Aran Islands.

Comedic style
The series is set in a humorously surreal world in which Ted is the only fully rounded normal character among "caricatures", according to Graham Linehan: "exaggerated-over-friendly, over-quiet, over-stupid, over-dull [...] they really only got one thing, they've got one job."

Embarrassment plays a role in many storylines, in a similar fashion to Fawlty Towers. Linehan says, "if Ted is in a situation that is slightly embarrassing we get him out of it [...] by having him lying or cheating, basically digging a massive hole for himself". Arthur Mathews has described Seinfeld as a major influence on the comedy of Father Ted, with himself and Linehan being "big fans" of the show. Father Ted also contains references to pop culture, and some film parodies, such as the episode "Speed 3".

Regarding the series's religious content, Linehan says "Ted doesn't have an anti-religious view of life, but a non-religious view. It's a job to him. He doesn't care about religion." While writing, he says the show's creators imagined Ted and Dougal as "just two people who happen to be [priests]".

Reception
Father Ted was met with critical acclaim and is one of the most popular sitcoms in Irish TV history. The Irish media frequently uses the series as a point of comparison in political stories.

In 1996 and 1999, the show won the BAFTA award for Best Comedy, while Morgan also won Best Comedy Performance. In 1995 the show won Best New TV Comedy at the British Comedy Awards, with O'Hanlon receiving Top TV Comedy Newcomer Award. At the 1996 British Comedy Awards the show won Top Channel 4 Sitcom Award, McLynn took the Top TV Comedy Actress award. In 1997 the show was given the Best Channel 4 Sitcom Award. It was also ranked at number 50 in the BFI's 2000 list of the 100 greatest British television programmes of the 20th century, the highest ranking Channel 4 production on the list. In 2004, it came 11th in the poll for Britain's Best Sitcom. In August 2012, Channel 4 viewers voted the series as the No 1 in C4's 30 Greatest Comedy Shows.

Notable fans of the show include director Steven Spielberg, musicians Liam Gallagher, Madonna, Cher and Moby, actors Jim Carrey and Steve Martin, comedian Ricky Gervais, and wrestler Sheamus. Maurice Gibb of the Bee Gees was buried with a copy of the DVD box set. Singer-songwriter Sinéad O'Connor is a fan, and attended the recording of the Christmas special. Irish musician Bono also requested to appear in the series.

In January 2007, a dispute arose between Inisheer and Inishmore over which island can claim to be Craggy Island, and thereby host a three-day Friends of Ted Festival. The dispute was settled by a five-a-side football match that February. Inishmore won 2–0 allowing them to use the title of Craggy Island until February 2008, while Inisheer was given the title of Rugged Island. The Friends of Ted Festival, better known as Ted Fest, has been held annually as a Father Ted fan convention since 2007.

In August 2020 An Post released a set of commemorative postage stamps, each with a catchphrase from the series on a background of the parochial house's lurid wallpaper, in a booklet listing Mrs Doyle's guesses for the name of Father Todd Unctious.

Several quotes from the series have entered the popular lexicon, such as "These are small, but the ones out there are far away. Small. Far away.", "Down with this sort of thing", and "I hear you're a racist now, Father".

Derivatives
On 1 January 2011, Channel 4 dedicated a night of programmes to celebrate the show's 15th anniversary year. This included "Father Ted: Unintelligent Design", a documentary on the show's influences, and "Small, Far Away: The World of Father Ted", a documentary revisiting the show's history with the writers and many of the surviving cast (Pauline McLynn declined to take part).

Roles reprised
In 2001, Pauline McLynn reprised her role as Mrs Doyle in a run of advertisements for the UK's Inland Revenue, reminding people to get their taxes in on time with her catchphrase from the programme ("Go on, go on, go on..."). It was voted in an Adwatch poll of 1,000 people as the year's worst advertisement.

Later in 2001, Ardal O'Hanlon returned to the role of Father Dougal for a series of PBS advertisements to coincide with Father Teds American broadcast; these segments were included on later DVD releases as "Fundraising with Father Dougal".

In 2012, Frank Kelly made a brief appearance as Father Jack on an episode of The One Show with Graham Norton.

In 2014, guest star Ben Keaton returned to the role of Father Austin Purcell, performing a stand-up routine and hosting the pub quiz "Arse Biscuits" in-character. In 2015, he launched the spin-off web series Cook Like a Priest.

In February 2016, Over The Top Wrestling marked the anniversary of Morgan's death with "Ah Ted", an event held in Dublin's Tivoli Variety Theatre. During the main-event tag-team match between The Lads From the Flats and The Kings of the North, Patrick McDonnell, Joe Rooney and Michael Redmond reprised their roles as Eoin McLove, Father Damo Lennon and Father Paul Stone respectively. McLove entered the ring first, withstanding one wrestler's attack on his crotch because he has "no willy", but was soon attacked by Father Damo, who brought the whistle he stole from Benson. Father Stone served as a special guest referee, performing a three-count so slow that one wrestler kicked out after two. In 2017, Rooney appeared as Father Damo in the video for Brave Giant's "The Time I Met the Devil", which follows him on the way to give Mass after a night of alcohol and sex.

Potential remakes
Since the end of the series, several attempts to remake Father Ted have been reported, but none has yet materialised.

In July 2003, it was announced that the show would be remade for the American market. The remake would be scripted by Spike Feresten, who previously wrote for US sitcoms Seinfeld and The Simpsons. Ferensten stated: "I was raised Catholic and this show just felt right to me. The essence of the show is about men who are also priests and, as men, they have many foibles." Hat Trick founders Denise O'Donoghue and Jimmy Mulville were set to produce. The US production company was Pariah Productions, which previously adapted The Kumars at No. 42 for an American audience.

In March 2004, Supanet Limited reported that an American remake was in development. This version would be set on a fictional island off the coast of New York. Steve Martin and Graham Norton would reportedly play Ted and Dougal. Martin had not been expected to take the role because of his stature, but agreed because he was a fan of the original series, and would reportedly be paid £500,000 per episode. Norton was cast based on his popularity with American audiences, and in reference to his appearance as Father Noel Furlong in the original series.

In November 2007, a separate American remake was announced. Rather than Craggy Island, this version would be set in an unfortunate fishing village in New England. American actor John Michael Higgins was cast as Ted, but expressed concerns about the show's religious themes: "The English have a very robust history of being unkind about religion. We don't have that in our country, we're frightened of it. It's basically that you guys are doing an Irish joke also, we don't have that. So I'll be Father Ted, we'll see how it goes." Filming was scheduled to begin in January 2008.

In January 2015, Linehan said that there had been "a few attempts" by US broadcasters to remake the show, including one which would have been set in Boston – an idea Linehan considered "ridiculous".

Musical
In an interview with Radio Times in January 2015, Linehan said that he wanted to revive Father Ted as a musical stage production. He stated that he would never revive the television series, "because of the risk you poison people's memories of the original", but that the completely new format would make the project worthwhile. He mentioned the possibility of a dance number with "spinning cardinals". He said that the musical would have to reference the Catholic child abuse scandals, saying, "The jokes would have to have a little bit more edge, because you just can't ignore this stuff." Mathews was "not as convinced" of the musical idea, though Linehan insisted it could work.

In December, Mathews said that he and Paul Woodfull were developing a Joshua Trio musical and a show focusing on a "Father Michael Cleary-type character", and that the Father Ted musical may follow. He expressed concerns that it would "dilute the product" or be seen as a "cash-in", but said that he believed there was an audience for the project. In April 2017, Linehan said that the musical would draw inspiration from The Book of Mormon, and would "go for the jugular ... You get all the things people loved about it, all the innocence and all the sweetness, but introduce a harder edge." Linehan also said that, being a special event, the musical would need to focus on a "world-shaking" story, possibly with Ted becoming Pope due to "some weird succession thing".

In June 2018, Linehan announced that Pope Ted: The Father Ted Musical was nearing completion, with a script by Linehan and Mathews. Linehan said, "It's the real final episode of Father Ted ... This was the right idea. Arthur and I have been laughing our arses off while writing it. Just like the old days." The Divine Comedy frontman Neil Hannon, who wrote the television show's music, composed the music.

In March 2022, Linehan said the musical had been cancelled by producers following the controversy over his views on transgender rights. He said that the musical was "ready to go", with a completed story and songs, but "just because a group of people have decided that anybody who speaks up against this ideology is evil, [the producers have] just kind of rolled over for those people. No one is standing up for me." Hannon, a longtime friend of Linehan's, said the project was difficult and said about the controversy around Linehan: "It's been difficult to watch what's happened. I believe in free speech, but I also very much believe in people's perfect right to remain completely silent on issues that they don't feel they can speak on. And that's all I want to say about it."

In December 2020, Linehan said he was seeking legal advice regarding Hat Trick Productions who he argued were preventing the musical from going into production owing to "activists" within the company.

Home video

United Kingdom and Ireland

United States

Australia

References

Further reading
 Father Ted: The Complete Scripts by Graham Linehan and Arthur Mathews, 1999, Boxtree Press, UK,

External links

 
 Father Ted  at EpisodeWorld.com
 Father Ted Filming Locations 
 Father Ted at British TV Resources
 
 
 Father Ted – the TV Series – h2g2 at bbc.co.uk
 Father Ted at TheFatherTedGuide.co.uk

 
1995 British television series debuts
1998 British television series endings
1990s British sitcoms
Channel 4 sitcoms
English-language television shows
Religious comedy television series
Catholicism in fiction
Television series by Hat Trick Productions
Television series created by Graham Linehan
Television shows set in the Republic of Ireland
Television series set on fictional islands
Television shows filmed in the Republic of Ireland
Television series about Christian religious leaders